In mathematics, weak convergence may refer to: 
 Weak convergence of random variables of a probability distribution
 Weak convergence of measures, of a sequence of probability measures
 Weak convergence (Hilbert space) of a sequence in a Hilbert space
 more generally, convergence in weak topology in a Banach space or a topological vector space